The Command and Staff College, abbreviated , PUM, also  translated as Inter-Service Command and Staff College, Israel, is intended for the training of senior Israel Defense Forces (IDF) officers. It was established on May 31, 1954. 

In mid-1980s the collected statistics showed that a significant number of senior officers paid little attention to this kind of study. This, together with the drawbacks in military training revealed during the 1982 Lebanon War, had led to a series of reorganizations, continued well into 2010s.

In 1991 all military colleges, including PUM, were merged into the IDF Military Colleges unit under the General Staff.  

In 2004 it was decided to add a course for Air Force.

Eventually the two courses were merged into a single "Afek course" (named after Sharon Afek) intended for commanders and staff officers ranked Lieutenant Colonel and above from all military arms. 

In 2018 the University of Haifa had won the first-ever educational tender from the IDF for all military colleges, including PUM.

Commanders
1954-1956: Aharon Yariv, member of the founding team and the first commander
1969-1972: Moshe Peled
2001-2004: , tat-aluf (Brigadier general)
2004-2006: Amos Ben-Abraham
2006-2009: Avi Ashkenazi
2009-2011: Noam Tivon
2011-2014: Harel Knafo
2014: Herzi Halevi
2014-2015: Roni Numa
2015-2016: , tat-aluf 
2016-2019: , rav-aluf (Lieutenant general)
2019-present: Rafi Milo, tat-aluf

See also
National Security College (Israel)

References

Further reading
Tamir Libel, "David’s Shield? The Decline and Partial Rise of the IDF Command and General Staff College", Baltic Security and Defence Review, 12(2), 2010, pp. 50-79

Israel Defense Forces
Military education and training in Israel